Ursula Lillig (1938–2004) was a German film and television actress.

Selected filmography
 Girl from Hong Kong (1961)

References

Bibliography

External links

1938 births
2004 deaths
German television actresses
German film actresses
Actors from Magdeburg